The Classical Lyceum Umberto I is a secondary school situated in Amendola Square, Naples.

History 
The Classical Lyceum Umberto I was founded in 1862 in Naples, Italy.

Notable alumni 
 Antonio Jatta (1852–1912), an Italian politician and lichenologist
 Giorgio Napolitano, an Italian politician who was the 11th President of Italy from 2006 until 2015.
 Erri De Luca, an Italian novelist
 Luigi Miraglia, an Italian classicist and Latinist

References

External links 
 Official Website

Educational institutions established in 1862
Liceo classico
Schools in Naples
1862 establishments in Italy